Edward Joris (1876–1957) was a Belgian anarchist who was involved in the 1905 bombing in Istanbul known as the Yıldız assassination attempt.

Life
Born in 1876, Joris left school at 13 and worked as a shipping clerk. Engaging in left-wing politics, he was secretary of his local branch of the Belgian Workers' Party from 1895 to 1898, as well as for a trade union. He contributed to the anarchist newspaper Ontwaking under the pseudonym Edward Greene.

In 1901 he travelled to Istanbul, where he was briefly employed writing commercial correspondence in French and English and then found work at the Singer sewing machine company. In 1902 his fiancée, Anna Nellens, joined him in Istanbul and they got married.

Through a coworker, Joris became involved with the Armenian Revolutionary Federation, and hence in a plot to assassinate Sultan Abdul Hamid II. The conspirators met for discussions and stored explosives and firearms in his house. The bombing was carried out on 21 July 1905, killing 26 and injuring 58 but failing to harm the sultan himself. Joris was arrested six days later. He was brought to trial on 25 November and sentenced to death on 18 December. Due to diplomatic pressure from Belgium, the sentence was never carried out. A support committee was set up by left-wing intellectuals in Belgium, to maintain pressure on the Belgian government to work for his release. Joris was kept in prison until 23 December 1907 and then returned to Belgium. His letters from prison formed the basis of a later book about his involvement in the plot.

After his return to Belgium, Joris worked as a bookseller and was secretary to the Antwerp branch of the Ligue des droits de l'homme. After the First World War he was convicted of collaborating with the occupying forces' Flamenpolitik, and sought refuge in the Netherlands. He returned to Belgium after an amnesty in 1929 and worked as a self-employed publicity agent. He died in 1957.

References

1876 births
1957 deaths
Belgian anarchists
People convicted on terrorism charges
Expatriates from Belgium in the Ottoman Empire